Microvirga lotononidis  is a nitrogen fixing, Gram-negative, rod-shaped and non-spore-forming root-nodule bacteria from the genus of Microvirga. Microvirga lotononidis lives in symbiosis with Listia angolensis.

References

Further reading

External links
Type strain of Microvirga lotononidis at BacDive -  the Bacterial Diversity Metadatabase

Hyphomicrobiales
Bacteria described in 2012